Jerome Aloysius Daugherty Sebastian (November 22, 1895 – October 11, 1960) was an American clergyman of the Roman Catholic Church. He served as an auxiliary bishop of the Archdiocese of Baltimore from 1954 until his death in 1960.

Biography
Jerome Sebastian was born in Washington, D.C., to William Henry and Kathryn (née Lyons) Sebastian. He was named after Jerome Daugherty. He received his early education at St. Patrick's Academy in his native city, and attended St. Charles College in Catonsville, Maryland. He then made his theological studies at St. Mary's Seminary in Baltimore.

On May 25, 1922, he was ordained to the priesthood by Archbishop Michael Joseph Curley. He served as a curate, and afterwards pastor, at St. Elizabeth Church in Baltimore. He also served as director of Sodality Union of Baltimore, director of the Women's Retreat League of Baltimore, director of Junior Newman Centres, chaplain of the Carroll Club of Johns Hopkins University, prosynodal judge of the archdiocesan tribunal, and director of vocations.

On December 22, 1953, Sebastian was appointed Auxiliary Bishop of Baltimore and Titular Bishop of Baris in Hellesponto by Pope Pius XII. He received his episcopal consecration on February 24, 1954 from Archbishop Amleto Giovanni Cicognani, with Bishops John Joyce Russell and Lawrence Shehan serving as co-consecrators, at Assumption Cathedral. He also served as vicar general of the archdiocese. He consecrated the Cathedral of Mary Our Queen on October 13, 1959.

He died at age 64, and was the first person to be buried in the crypt at the Cathedral of Mary Our Queen.

See also

Historical list of the Catholic bishops of the United States

References

1895 births
1960 deaths
People from Washington, D.C.
20th-century American Roman Catholic titular bishops
St. Charles College alumni
St. Mary's Seminary and University alumni
Johns Hopkins University people